Albert Henry George Grey, 4th Earl Grey,  (28 November 185129 August 1917) was a British peer and politician who served as Governor General of Canada 1904–1911, the ninth since Canadian Confederation. He was a radical Liberal aristocrat and a member of a string of liberal high society clubs in London. An active and articulate campaigner in late Victorian England he was associated with many of the leading Imperialists seeking change.

Albert Grey was born into a noble and political family, though at birth not in direct line to inherit the earldom. His father, General Charles Grey, was a younger brother of the 3rd Earl, who died without issue. As General Grey was deceased, the titles descended to his eldest living son Albert, then in his forties. Albert was educated at Harrow School before going up to Trinity College, Cambridge, where he graduated MA and LLM.  "His grandfather was the 2nd Earl Grey, who was prime minister of the United Kingdom from 1830 to 1834 and, reputedly, the recipient of a diplomatic gift from China of black tea scented with bergamot oil, which became known as Earl Grey tea."

In 1878, he entered into politics as a member of the Liberal Party and, after relinquishing a tied vote to his opponent, eventually won a place in the British House of Commons in 1880. In 1894 Grey inherited the Earldom Grey from his uncle, the third Earl, and thereafter took his place in the House of Lords, while simultaneously undertaking business ventures around the British Empire as Director of the British South Africa Company from 1898, he experienced a steep learning curve during high tension with the Boers. As administrator in Rhodesia he was directly responsible to Cecil Rhodes for conduct of the colony's business from 1894 to 1897. On his return in 1899 he was appointed Lord Lieutenant of his native Northumberland.

Grey was appointed as Governor General of Canada by King Edward VII in 1904, on the recommendation of Prime Minister of the United Kingdom Arthur Balfour, to replace the Earl of Minto as viceroy and occupied that post until succeeded by Prince Arthur, Duke of Connaught and Strathearn, in 1911. Grey travelled extensively in Canada and was active in Canadian political affairs, including national unity, leaving behind him a number of legacies, the most prominent being the Grey Cup.

Youth, education, and early career

Grey was the younger and only surviving son of General Sir Charles Grey—a younger son of former British prime minister the second Earl Grey and later the private secretary to Prince Albert and later still to Queen Victoria—and his wife, Caroline Eliza Farquhar, eldest daughter of Sir Thomas Harvie Farquhar, Bt. He was born at Cadogan House, Middlesex. Many members of the family had enjoyed successful political careers based on reform, including to colonial policies; Grey's grandfather, while prime minister, championed the Reform Act 1832 and in 1846, Grey's uncle, the third Earl Grey, as Secretary of State for War and the Colonies during the first ministry of Lord John Russell, was the first to suggest that colonies should be self-sustaining and governed for the benefit of their inhabitants, instead of for the benefit of the United Kingdom.

Grey was educated at Harrow School and then Trinity College, Cambridge, where he studied history and law. After graduating in 1873, Grey became private secretary to Sir Henry Bartle Frere and, as Frere was a member of the Council of India, Grey accompanied Prince Albert Edward, Prince of Wales, on his tour of India. In 1877, Grey married Alice Holford, daughter of Robert Stayner Holford, the Member of Parliament for East Gloucestershire. Together, they had five children, one of whom died in early childhood.

Parliamentary and administrative career
Grey stood for parliament at South Northumberland in 1878 and polled in the election the same number of votes as his opponent Edward Ridley, but Grey declined a scrutiny and was not returned. It was not until the general election of 1880 that Grey, the Liberal Party candidate, was elected as a member of parliament (MP) for South Northumberland, a seat he held until it was replaced under the Redistribution of Seats Act 1885 and he moved to be the MP for Tyneside, following that year's election. In 1884 he wrote to the Manchester-based Women's Suffrage Journal declaring his support for women's suffrage, writing that "[t]here are no questions which receive so little attention, or which, in my opinion, so urgently call for the close and serious consideration of social reformers, as those affecting the condition of women. The possession of a vote by women who are heads of households will lead to the formation of associations and unions for the protection and advancement of the interests of their sex."

Inspired by the theories of Giuseppe Mazzini, Grey became an advocate of imperialism and was one of the founders of the Imperial Federation League, which sought to transform the British Empire into an Imperial Federation. Grey thus split with Prime Minister William Gladstone in 1886 over Irish home rule and became a Liberal Unionist, but the shift was short-lived as Grey failed to win his constituency again in the 1886 general election.

Eight years later, Grey succeeded his uncle, Henry George Grey, as the 4th Earl Grey and returned to parliament when taking his seat in the House of Lords. As a friend of Cecil Rhodes, Grey became one of the first four trustees responsible for the administration of the scholarship funds which established the Rhodes Scholarship and he was invited by Rhodes to be a member of the board of directors and director of the British South Africa Company, coming to serve as the main liaison between Rhodes and Secretary of State for the Colonies Joseph Chamberlain in the periods immediately before and after the Jameson Raid on the Transvaal. As the Administrator of Southern Rhodesia, Sir Leander Starr Jameson, was disgraced by the Jameson Raid, the British government, then headed by the Marquess of Salisbury, in 1896 asked Grey to serve as Jameson's immediate replacement, staying in that role until 1897. Two years later, Grey was also appointed as Lord Lieutenant of Northumberland and published a brief biography of a young relative, Hubert Hervey, who was killed in the Second Matabele War.

Governor General of Canada

In office
It was on 4 October 1904 announced that King Edward VII had, by commission under the royal sign-manual and signet, approved the recommendation of his British prime minister, Arthur Balfour, to appoint Grey as his representative, replacing Grey's brother-in-law, the Earl of Minto. (Minto was married to Grey's sister, Mary Caroline Grey.) The appointment came at a good time for Grey, as a series of failed investments in South Africa had left him penniless; a gift from his wife's aunt, Lady Wantage (widow of the Lord Wantage), was used to supplement his salary as governor general.

The time during which Grey occupied the viceregal office was one of increasing immigration, industrialisation, and economic development in Canada. A sign of Canada's increasing independence from Britain, Grey was on 16 June 1905 designated as "Governor General of Canada and Commander-in-Chief of the Dominion of Canada," which followed on the passing of the Militia Act in 1904. At the request of Sir Robert Baden-Powell, Grey also undertook the role of Chief Scout of Canada. Further, it was with Grey's granting of Royal Assent to the appropriate Acts of Parliament that Alberta and Saskatchewan were separated from the North-West Territories to become provinces, also in 1905the Governor General writing to the King at the time: "[each one] a new leaf in Your Majesty's Maple Crown"and he travelled extensively around the ever-growing country. He also journeyed abroad to the Dominion of Newfoundland (then not yet a part of Canada) and several times to the United States to visit President Theodore Roosevelt, with whom Grey developed a strong bond.

Grey often exercised his right, as representative of a constitutional monarch, to advise, encourage, and warn. He desired social reform and cohesion. He put his support behind prison reforms in Canada to provide greater social justice. He was also an advocate for electoral reform, endorsing proportional representation. His past calls for political equality for Irish Catholics were relevant to Canada's internal politics, divided as the population was between Catholics and Protestants, Francophones and Anglophones.

As governor General, Grey also encouraged his prime minister, Sir Wilfrid Laurier, to support the Imperial Federation he had long championed, but Laurier was uninterested. However, Grey's years of urging Laurier to get the Cabinet and parliament to agree to the idea of a Canadian navy proved themselves to be more fruitful. At the Governor General's urging, the Canadian and British governments agreed to have Canada assume control of the former British garrisons at Halifax, Nova Scotia, and Esquimalt, British Columbia, after which the Royal Canadian Navy was created by the Naval Service Act. The Act was so identified with Grey that, in Quebec, it was referred to as Grey's Bill and opposed by Henri Bourassa and his Ligue nationaliste canadienne. Another of Grey's suggestions was a railway hotel for the federal capital, which eventuated in the Château Laurier, completed in 1912.

Though Grey strongly promoted national unity among French and English Canadians, as well as advocating unity within the entire British Empire, his causes frequently raised the ire of Bourassa and the Quebec nationalists. Grey was involved in the planning for the tercentennial of Quebec in 1908, marking the 300th anniversary of the landing of Samuel de Champlain at what later became Quebec City. At Grey's suggestion, the Cabinet agreed to Grey's plan to have the Plains of Abraham designated as a national park; this would be done to coincide with the Quebec celebrations and Grey saw the official ceremony as being an event that would promote Franco-Anglo-American friendship. The government arranged for the attendance of the Prince of Wales (later King George V), American and French warships, and a host of visiting dignitaries. Still, the Ligue saw this as solely a tribute to the Empire; Bourassa and other nationalists complained that Grey had transformed a day intended to celebrate Samuel de Champlain into a celebration of James Wolfe.

At other times, and unlike future viceroys, the Governor General's influence expanded more blatantly into government policy: Grey opposed the head tax imposed by the Chinese Immigration Act of 1885 on Chinese immigrants to Canada and, at one point, was invited to visit the province of British Columbia, but declined in protest of what he thought to be exclusionary measures implemented by the provincial cabinet under premier Richard McBride. Grey also initially supported Asian immigration to Canada, though, following the Japanese victory in the Russo-Japanese War, he became concerned about the so-called Yellow Peril and worked with the federal Cabinet to explore alternatives to the head tax as a restriction on Asian immigration. He was nevertheless appalled by the 1907 anti-Asian riots in Vancouver, organised by the Asiatic Exclusion League, and, later in the same year, arranged a visit to Canada by Prince Fushimi Sadanaru of the Empire of Japan.

Legacy

Throughout his tenure as governor general, Grey supported the arts and, when he departed Canada in 1911, he left behind him the Grey Competition for Music and Drama, first held in 1907. He was also a patron of sport, his feelings on health and fitness a part of his broader desire for a reform movement. He gave his support to Canadian football and established the Grey Cup, to be awarded to the winner of the Senior Amateur Football Championship of Canada; it is today presented to the champions of the Canadian Football League and, in 1963, Grey was elected to the Canadian Football Hall of Fame for his contributions to the game. Grey further donated trophies to the Montreal Horse Show and for figure skating. As well, he gave to the Crown a horse-drawn carriage he purchased from the Governor-General of Australia, which is still today used as the state landau, and added a study and conservatory to Rideau Hall, the sovereign's and governor general's Ottawa residence; the latter was torn down in 1924. Grey and his wife were commended for their work in Canada and for their championing social reforms. Laurier said Lord Grey gave "his whole heart, his whole soul, and his whole life to Canada."

Final years
On leaving office in 1911 Earl Grey and his family returned to the United Kingdom, where he became president of the Royal Colonial Institute (now the Royal Commonwealth Society).

He did not retire from public affairs. He lobbied and organized toward several goals:

1. to help those who are endeavoring to fight the slums. 

2. to help the worker forward in the path of his natural evolution from the status of worker to that of partner.

3. proportional representation -- by "the removal of the disparity between Parliamentary constituencies with 40,000 electors, on the one hand, and on the other, other constituencies with less than as many hundreds." (through creation of equal-sized single-member districts. Earl Grey was also a proponent of PR in the sense of elected representation reflecting how votes are cast. In 1916, he was honorary president of the Proportional Representation Society of Canada and president of the British PR Society.

4. Public House Trust [temperance refreshment houses], which is "a necessary adjunct to the first two items of his programme."

On 28 March 1916, he was appointed by King George V as Chancellor of the Order of St. Michael and St. George. However, Grey died the following year at his family residence.

Family 

Grey married Alice Holford (d. 22 September 1944), daughter of Robert Stayner Holford, of Westonbirt House (Gloucestershire) and Dorchester House (London) on 9 June 1877 and had five children, one of whom died in early childhood:
 Lady Victoria Mary Sybil Grey (9 June 1878 – 3 February 1907) married Lt-Col. Arthur Morton Grenfell, of Wilton Park in 1901, and had children.
 Charles Robert Grey, 5th Earl Grey (15 December 1879 – 2 April 1963), who had two daughters by his wife Lady Mabel Laura Georgiana Palmer, daughter of William Palmer, 2nd Earl of Selborne. The elder daughter Mary (1907–2002) married the 1st Baron Howick of Glendale.
 Lady Sybil Grey (15 July 1882 – 4 June 1966) O.B.E. married Lambert William Middleton (1877–1941) of Lowood House, Melrose, Scottish Borders, nephew of Sir Arthur Middleton, 7th Baronet and Frederick Edmund Meredith. She was invested as an Officer, Order of the British Empire in 1918, having served as the Commandant of the Dorchester House Hospital for Officers. She was well known for her work with the Red Cross in Russia during WWI, and for her work with tuberculosis sufferers (founding the Lady Grey Society). She was an amateur photographer and filmmaker of note, and recorded village life at Darnick and St. Boswells. After her husband died she sold Lowood House and moved to Burley, Hampshire. They had a son and a daughter.
 Lady Evelyn Alice Grey (14 Mar 1886–15 Apr 1971) married Sir Lawrence Evelyn Jones, 5th Bt. M.C., grandson of Sir Willoughby Jones.
 Lady Lillian Winifred Grey (11 June 1891 – 7 April 1895)

Ancestry

Honours

Appointments
  13 March 189922 January 1901: Her Majesty's Lieutenant and Custos Rotulorum of the County of Northumberland
 22 January 190113 December 1904: His Majesty's Lieutenant and Custos Rotulorum of the County of Northumberland
  7 October 190428 March 1916: Knight Commander of the Most Distinguished Order of Saint Michael and Saint George (KCMG)
 28 March 191629 August 1917: Chancellor of the Most Distinguished Order of Saint Michael and Saint George (KCMG)
  190713 October 1911: Chief Scout for Canada
  23 July 190829 August 1917: Knight Grand Cross of the Royal Victorian Order (GCVO)
  29 June 190929 August 1917: Member of His Majesty's Most Honourable Privy Council (PC)
  3 March 191029 August 1917: Knight of Grace of the Most Venerable Order of the Hospital of Saint John of Jerusalem (KStJ)
  18 March 191029 August 1917: Honorary Colonel of the Northumberland Fusiliers 6th Battalion
  23 October 191129 August 1917: Knight Grand Cross of the Most Honourable Order of the Bath (GCB)

Medals
  1902: King Edward VII Coronation Medal
  1911: King George V Coronation Medal

Honorary military appointments
  10 December 190413 October 1911: Colonel of the Governor General's Horse Guards
  10 December 190413 October 1911: Colonel of the Governor General's Foot Guards
  10 December 190413 October 1911: Colonel of the Canadian Grenadier Guards

Honorific eponyms

Geographic locations
  Saskatchewan: Earl Grey
  British Columbia: Mount Earl Grey
  British Columbia: Earl Grey Pass

Schools
  Manitoba: Earl Grey Public School, Winnipeg
  Saskatchewan: Earl Grey School, Earl Grey
  Ontario: Earl Grey Senior Public School, Toronto

Arms

References

External links

1851 births
1917 deaths
Alumni of Trinity College, Cambridge
British Anglicans
Canadian Football Hall of Fame inductees
Governors General of Canada
Knights Grand Cross of the Order of the Bath
Knights Grand Cross of the Royal Victorian Order
Knights Grand Cross of the Order of St Michael and St George
Knights of Grace of the Order of St John
Howick, Albert Grey, Viscount
Lord-Lieutenants of Northumberland
People educated at Harrow School
Liberal Unionist Party MPs for English constituencies
Howick, Albert Grey, Viscount
Howick, Albert Grey, Viscount
Grey, E4
Wanderers F.C. players
Chief Scouts of Canada
Members of the Privy Council of the United Kingdom
Earls Grey
Association footballers not categorized by position
Liberal Unionist Party peers
English footballers